Cyclic nucleotide gated channel alpha 2, also known as CNGA2, is a human gene encoding an ion channel protein.

See also
 Cyclic nucleotide-gated ion channel

References

Further reading

External links 
 

Ion channels
Mutated genes